Rachel McTavish is a broadcast journalist who formerly worked for STV.

Career
On 28 April 2008, McTavish
joined STV's regional magazine programme The Five Thirty Show, replacing Debi Edward – first as a stand-in and then, permanently when Edward joined ITV News. McTavish went on to co-host the show until 15 May 2009. The programme was axed and replaced by an hour-long programme entitled The Hour.

References

ITN newsreaders and journalists
ITV regional newsreaders and journalists
STV News newsreaders and journalists
Scottish women television presenters
Scottish women journalists
Living people
Year of birth missing (living people)